Virginia Ruano Pascual and Paola Suárez were the defending champions, but lost in quarterfinals to Els Callens and Émilie Loit.

Svetlana Kuznetsova and Martina Navratilova won the title, defeating Jelena Dokic and Nadia Petrova 6–4, 5–7, 6–2 in the final. It was the 6th doubles title for Kuznetsova and the 170th doubles title for Navratilova, in their respective careers.

Seeds
The first four seeds received a bye into the second round.

Draw

Finals

Top half

Bottom half

References
 Main and Qualifying Draws

Women's Doubles
Italian Open - Doubles